The Great Yarmouth Mercury is a weekly newspaper serving the Great Yarmouth area of Norfolk, England. The paper was established in 1880. It is published by the Archant group.

References 

Archant
Great Yarmouth
Newspapers established in 1880
Newspapers published in Norfolk
Weekly newspapers published in the United Kingdom
1880 establishments in England